Gerhard Auer (29 June 1943 – 21 September 2019) was a German rower who competed for West Germany in the 1972 Summer Olympics.

Auer was born in Tepl. He competed at the 1970 World Rowing Championships in St. Catharines in the coxed four and won gold. He was a crew member of the West German boat which won the gold medal in the coxed fours event at the 1972 Summer Olympics in Munich.

References

External links 
 
 

1943 births
2019 deaths
People from Cheb District
People from Sudetenland
Olympic rowers of West Germany
Rowers at the 1972 Summer Olympics
Olympic gold medalists for West Germany
Olympic medalists in rowing
West German male rowers
World Rowing Championships medalists for West Germany
Medalists at the 1972 Summer Olympics
Sudeten German people
European Rowing Championships medalists